Gairi Bisouna Deupur is a village development committee in Kavrepalanchok District in  Bagmati Province of central Nepal. At the time of the 1991 Nepal census it had a population of 5,205 and had 928 houses in it.

References

Gairi Bisouna Deupur is touristic place. Here is also a place to grow herbs to be used in medicine. Once upon a time when a child was going to be born his relatives dug a floor and found god's head. Then they also found blood of god and then named this VDC DEVPUR. Dev means God and Pur means here under soil. It has five main temples.

External links
UN map of the municipalities of Kavrepalanchok District

Populated places in Kavrepalanchok District